This is the discography of the Matthew Good Band, a Canadian alternative rock band from British Columbia.

Demos

Studio albums

EPs

Compilations

 Note: Contains material from the Matthew Good Band as well as Matthew Good's solo releases.

Singles

Music videos

See also
 Matthew Good discography

References

External links
http://mattgood.imgarbage.com/video.php

Discographies of Canadian artists
Folk music discographies
Rock music group discographies